Australia submitted an unsuccessful bid for the 2022 FIFA World Cup. On 2 December 2010 FIFA announced that the event would be held in Qatar. Australia also lodged a bid for the 2018 World Cup, but withdrew the bid on 10 June 2010. The 2018 and 2022 World Cups will be the 21st and 22nd editions of the FIFA World Cup. The bidding procedure to host both the 2018 and 2022 FIFA World Cup began in January 2009, and national associations had until 2 February 2009 to register their interest. The bid was presented by Frank Lowy, Ben Buckley, Quentin Bryce and Elle Macpherson.

Schedule

After decades of hypothesising Australia's credentials to host the FIFA World Cup, the Howard Government welcomed tentative investigations into the viability of hosting the tournament as early as 2002. Football Australia, known at the time as Soccer Australia, targeted bidding for the 2014 edition of the tournament. After realising that Brazil were overwhelmingly likely to receive the hosting rights - which they did in 2007 - Football Federation Australia focused on a formal bid for the 2018 FIFA World Cup, announcing their intention to do so in November 2007. After FIFA in December 2008 announced they would be accepting bids for both the 2018 and 2022 FIFA World Cup, Australia registered their intention to bid with FIFA for the 2022 FIFA World Cup in February 2009.

The bid was officially launched on 14 June 2009 at Parliament House in Canberra.

Voting

Potential venues

Submitted bid venues

The following are the 12 venues that were submitted to FIFA on 14 May 2010 as part of the FFA's bid to host the 2022 FIFA World Cup:

Rejected bid venues
The following is a list of stadiums that were considered at one time as part of the FFA's bid to host the 2022 FIFA World Cup, but did not make the final cut:

Ground sharing issues
Of the Australian stadiums that meet FIFA's seating criteria, none are primary association football venues. They are predominantly cricket, Australian rules football and rugby league playing venues. At the proposed time of the World Cup during the northern hemisphere summer, these facilities are normally in regular season use by Australian rules football and the rugby codes. Former England international, Peter Withe, now living in Australia, observed that "... there are some great stadiums in Australia but a lot of them are Aussie rules arenas. These are not great for the round ball."

The need for all World Cup stadia to be used only for World Cup games prior to and during the World Cup caused controversy with the Australian Football League, and National Rugby League, who claim that loss of access to almost all their major venues for eight weeks would severely disrupt their seasons and even impact the viability of their clubs. The AFL advised it would not give up Docklands Stadium in Melbourne, and the management of Docklands Stadium (which includes the AFL as part owners of the venue) ruled out use of the stadium for the bid. The use of these shared venues remains the only option for the bid, with the Australian authorities unwilling to invest massive amounts of money in new association football-only stadia. The development of Kardinia Park (Skilled Stadium) in Geelong has been proposed to replace the loss of Docklands Stadium in the FFA bid, following the World Cup the stadium would be reconfigured to a larger oval for AFL use. Compensation claims for the disrupted seasons of the local codes may run into several hundred million dollars. The AFL and NRL and possibly also the Australian Rugby Union (ARU) will lobby for equity from government.

The AFL, NRL and FFA announced it had signed a Memorandum of Understanding on 9 May 2010, guaranteeing the AFL and NRL seasons will continue, should the bid be successful, and compensation for the other football codes may be awarded as a result of any disruptions caused by hosting the World Cup.

The seasons for Australia's football codes are as follows:

"Q" denotes pre-competition qualifiers
"S" denotes the start of the regular-season.
"P" denotes playoff(s)/postseason/knockout stages. 
"F" denotes Final(s).

Cost concerns and benefits
Several stories in the Australian media question the restrictions and privileges that FIFA will demand of host cities at taxpayer expense, in addition to the need to build and improve so many stadia or whether "mega-events" like the World Cup are cost-effective. The FFA has argued that these costs are overstated.

A report conducted by McKinsey consultants on behalf of FIFA, rated an Australian World Cup to be the worst in term of revenue. The United States were rated at 100%, Japan 73%, South Korea 71%, Qatar 70%, and Australia on 68%.

A study by global research firm IBISWorld claimed that the 2022 World Cup would be worth $35.5 billion to the Australian economy – four times the amount generated by the 2000 Sydney Olympics.

Government support 
Australia's bid has received government support from an early stage, with former-Prime Minister John Howard announcing federal and state/territory government support before FFA announced their intention to bid.

Bid Chairman Frank Lowy AC announced at the bid launch that he has the personal commitment of the then-Australian Prime Minister, Kevin Rudd, who announced the Federal Government's support for the bid in February 2008. In December 2008, Federal minister for sport Kate Ellis announced that the federal government would give Football Federation Australia $45.6 million to fund its World Cup bid preparation. Leader of the Opposition Malcolm Turnbull affirmed the support of the Opposition on 11 December 2008 and again at the formal launch of the bid in June 2009.

Rudd met with Sepp Blatter to discuss the Federal Government's support of the bid in Zurich in July 2009.

On 23 December 2009, with concerns over costs and effects of the bid upon other sporting codes, the Federal Government established a task force to take over much of the communication lacking by the bid in Australia. The taskforce will negotiate with governments regarding responsibility for stadium improvements, new facilities and financial guarantees. It will also organise and clarify ground-sharing arrangements with other sports and possible compensation for loss of venues.

Bid website 
Australia's bid website was launched 14 June 2009 and contained bid information as well as being a social media platform where users could share content and connect with each other.

At the launch, FFA chairman Frank Lowy AC said the people of Australia were its "secret weapon" to snaring the 2018 or 2022 FIFA World Cup and encouraged the public to join the Association football-themed social networking web site. The public campaign was the first bid for a major event driven almost entirely by social media. Actress Nicole Kidman, actor Hugh Jackman, model Elle Macpherson and sports stars Ian Thorpe (swimming), Liz Ellis (netball), Mark Webber (Formula One) and Steve Waugh (cricket) joined to help promote the bid.

Official bid partners
 Qantas
 Cisco Systems
 PricewaterhouseCoopers

References

External links
Official website
2022 FIFA World Cup Bid Evaluation Report: Australia

2022 FIFA World Cup bids
Football Australia
Soccer in Australia
2022 in Australian sport
2022 in Australian soccer